In operator theory, a set  is said to be a spectral set for a (possibly unbounded) linear operator  on a Banach space if the spectrum of  is in  and von-Neumann's inequality holds for  on  - i.e. for all rational functions  with no poles on 

This concept is related to the topic of analytic functional calculus
of operators. In general, one wants to get more details about the operators constructed from functions with the original operator as the variable.

For a detailed discussion between Spectral Sets and von Neumann's inequality, see.

Functional analysis